Elections to the Nagaland Legislative Assembly were held in February 1998 to elect members of the 60 constituencies in Nagaland, India. The Indian National Congress won a majority of the seats and S. C. Jamir was re-appointed as the Chief Minister of Nagaland. The number of constituencies was set as 60 by the recommendation of the Delimitation Commission of India.

Regional parties like the Naga People's Front did not contest these elections, and they were joined by the Bharatiya Janata Party in this action. In 43 of the constituencies, the INC candidate was the sole candidate and hence was declared the winner without a poll. In the other 17 constituencies, the INC candidate had to compete with one or more Independents. The Independents managed to win 7 of these seats.

Background
In 1997, the NSCN(I-M) signed a ceasefire agreement with the government. The agreement ensured that while the government would not push for counter-insurgency operations against the NSCN (I-M) cadre and its leadership, the rebels on their part would not target armed forces. The National Socialist Council of Nagaland and the Naga Hoho, (a tribal body), then demanded that upcoming elections should be postponed till the conclusion of the peace talks. Since the Election Commission wasn't amenable to their arguments, they called for a boycott of the polls even issuing threats to the various political parties where necessary.

Result

Elected members

Government Formation
On 5 March, S. C. Jamir was sworn in as the Chief Minister, by the Governor Om Prakash Sharma, for his second successive term. In addition, 11 other members of the Legislative assembly were sworn in as ministers in the cabinet. These included the future Chief Minister, Neiphiu Rio, who was made the Home minister.

See also
List of constituencies of the Nagaland Legislative Assembly
1998 elections in India

References

1998 in Nagaland
Nagaland
State Assembly elections in Nagaland
1998